Angelo Musone (born March 1, 1963) is an Italian former boxer, who won the Heavyweight bronze medal at the 1984 Summer Olympics. He was born in Marcianise.


Olympic results 
Defeated James Omondi (Kenya) 5-0
Defeated Kaliq Singh (India) walk-over
Defeated Håkan Brock (Sweden) 5-0
Lost to Henry Tillman (United States) 0-5

Career
In the Los Angeles Olympics, after American Henry Tillman was controversially awarded their semi-final contest on a 5-0 decision, the defeated Musone was cheered by the American fans as he left the ring in tears. British TV commentator Harry Carpenter was highly critical of the decision saying "Musone won that, and he won it well" and "if that is correct judging then I don't know what I'm talking about. I've never seen a man so shabbily treated in an Olympic boxing tournament".

Musone began his professional career undefeated in 18 fights, including a victory over a faded Leon Spinks in 1987. Later that year, Musone was defeated by KO by journeyman Steve Mormino, who dropped Musone twice in the sixth round, ending the fight. This was Musone's last pro fight. Musone later became a professional boxing referee and judge.

References
 
 Officiating records at BoxRec

External links 
 
 

1963 births
Living people
Sportspeople from the Province of Caserta
People from Marcianise
Olympic boxers of Italy
Boxers at the 1984 Summer Olympics
Olympic bronze medalists for Italy
Heavyweight boxers
Olympic medalists in boxing
Italian male boxers
Medalists at the 1984 Summer Olympics
Mediterranean Games silver medalists for Italy
Mediterranean Games medalists in boxing
Competitors at the 1983 Mediterranean Games
20th-century Italian people